Georges Guillon (born 10 October 1901, date of death unknown) was a French middle-distance runner. He competed in the men's 3000 metres steeplechase at the 1920 Summer Olympics.

References

External links
 

1901 births
Year of death missing
Athletes (track and field) at the 1920 Summer Olympics
French male middle-distance runners
French male steeplechase runners
Olympic athletes of France
Place of birth missing